The Albina Riot of 1967 occurred in the Albina District of Portland, Oregon, during a year when other cities were experiencing similar civil right demonstrations and urban unrest.

Background 
On July 30, 1967, a group of 100 to 150 people gathered in Irving Park. They were there to hear speakers from Portland, Seattle, and San Francisco talk about civil rights, poverty and unemployment, institutionalized discrimination, and police brutality.

In addition to other activist leaders, attendees expected Eldridge Cleaver, Minister of Information for the Black Panther Party, to make an appearance at the event. After days of rumors there would be civil unrest at the event, parents, ministers, and community leaders urged people to stay home. Police increased their patrols and were present at the event. Cleaver did not appear and tensions increased; young people threw rocks and bottles at the police. The disturbance quickly escalated when the group moved to nearby Union Avenue and set fires, broke windows, and looted a stereo store. The next night saw similar unrest and damage, but the police responded immediately. Mayor Terry Schrunk and Governor Tom McCall alerted the National Guard and State Police and asked them to remain close enough to respond within 10 to 15 minutes if they were needed.

The incident left some businesses permanently closed. The riots resulted in 115 arrests and over $50,000 in damaged property.

See also
 Portland foreclosure protest

References

Further reading
Joshua Joe Bryan. Portland, Oregon's Long Hot Summers: Racial Unrest and Public Response, 1967 - 1969

1967 in Oregon
1960s in Portland, Oregon
Riots and civil disorder in Oregon
African-American history in Portland, Oregon
1967 riots
July 1967 events in the United States
Long, hot summer of 1967